Stefanie Wittler is an American beauty pageant titleholder from Soddy-Daisy, Tennessee who was named Miss Tennessee 2009.

Biography
She won the title of Miss Tennessee on June 20, 2009, when she received her crown from outgoing titleholder Ellen Carrington. Wittler's platform is "Safe and Drug Free Tennessee" and she traveled to schools across the state speaking to students about the importance of staying away from drugs and alcohol during her year as Miss Tennessee. Her competition talent was a vocal rendition of Dolly Parton's "I Will Always Love You." Wittler is a graduate of Soddy Daisy High School and Belhaven University  She finished as the second runner-up in the Miss America 2010 pageant.

References

External links

 
 

Miss America 2010 delegates
Miss Tennessee winners
Living people
People from Soddy-Daisy, Tennessee
University of Tennessee at Chattanooga alumni
American beauty pageant winners
Year of birth missing (living people)